Tommy Lee (born September 11, 1941) is an American former football player and coach. He served as the head football coach at Willamette University from 1974 to 1981, and the University of Montana Western from 2001 to 2007, compiling an overall college football record of 66–79–2. After more than 40 years in the coaching profession, Lee retired from coaching in December 2012.

Head coaching record

College

References

External links
 Hawaii profile

1941 births
Living people
American football quarterbacks
American players of Canadian football
Canadian football quarterbacks
Hawaii Rainbow Warriors football coaches
Montana Grizzlies football coaches
Montana Western Bulldogs football coaches
Ottawa Rough Riders players
Portland State Vikings football coaches
San Antonio Riders coaches
Toronto Argonauts coaches
Utah Utes football coaches
Willamette Bearcats football coaches
Willamette Bearcats football players
Sportspeople from Honolulu
Players of American football from Honolulu
Players of Canadian football from Honolulu